Fort Belknap, located near Newcastle, Texas, was established in November 1851 by brevet Brigadier General William G. Belknap to protect the Texas frontier against raids by the Kiowa and Comanche.  It was the northernmost fort in a line from the Rio Grande to the Red River.  The fort functioned as a base of operations rather than as a fortified point, and it became the center of a substantial network of roads, including the Butterfield Overland Mail.  The fort was designated a National Historic Landmark in 1960, in recognition of its key role in securing the Texas frontier in the 1850s and 1860s.

Other forts in the frontier fort system were Forts Griffin, Concho, Richardson, Chadbourne, Stockton, Davis, Bliss, McKavett, Clark, McIntosh, Inge, and Phantom Hill in Texas, and Sill in Oklahoma.  Subposts or intermediate stations also were used, including Bothwick's Station on Salt Creek between Fort Richardson and Fort Belknap, Camp Wichita near Buffalo Springs between Fort Richardson and Red River Station, and Mountain Pass between Fort Concho and Fort Griffin.

Some notable officers who were stationed at Fort Belknap include Captain Randolph B. Marcy and Lieutenant George B. McClellan. Together, the officers explored the Canadian River and found the headwaters of the Red River.  The Second Cavalry was headquartered here in 1858 under the command of Major George H. Thomas.

Prior to the outbreak of the American Civil War, the post was abandoned, partly as a pullback of federal troops to the north, and partly due to the fort's unreliable water supply.  "Northern Indians fell upon the hapless Texas frontier with such violence that a whole tier of frontier counties was disbanded..."  Families remaining in Young County "huddled in the abandoned buildings of Fort Belknap" and "during snow storms sought shelter in the abandoned buildings."

The fort was briefly reoccupied in 1867, then abandoned for the last time.

The fort was gradually dismantled for building materials, so that by 1936, only the magazine and part of the cornhouse remained. Beginning with the Texas Centennial, portions of the fort were rebuilt and restored, mostly on their original foundations.  Starting in 2019, the fort underwent a renovation to update the museum housed in the commissary building and build a new support structure for the historic grape arbor. The arbor includes the largest mustang (muscadine) grape vine known to exist.

The fort is home to the Fort Belknap Archives, which houses records from North Texas.

Gallery

See also

List of National Historic Landmarks in Texas
National Register of Historic Places listings in Young County, Texas
Recorded Texas Historic Landmarks in Young County
Texas Forts Trail
Forts of Texas

References

Butterfield Overland Mail in Texas
Belknap
National Historic Landmarks in Texas
Native American history of Texas
Buildings and structures in Young County, Texas
1851 establishments in Texas
Government buildings completed in 1851
Belknap
National Register of Historic Places in Young County, Texas
Stagecoach stops in the United States